Joffe (Joffé, Иоффе, Ioffe, Yoffe) is a Hebrew-language surname, a variant of Jaffe. Notable people with this surname include:

 Abraham Z. Joffe, Soviet and then Israeli mycologist
 Abram Fedorovich Ioffe, Russian physicist
 Adolph Joffe (Adolf Joffe), Russian Marxist revolutionary and Soviet politician
 Avraham Yoffe, Israeli general and politician
 Boris Yoffe (born 1968), Russian-born Israeli composer
 Carole Joffe, American sociologist and reproductive rights advocate
 Chantal Joffe, English painter
 Charles H. Joffe, American film producer
 Dina Joffe (born 1952), Latvian pianist, Israeli citizen
 Emily Yoffe, American journalist
 Francois Jouffa, French journalist 
 Inna Yoffe (born 1988), Israeli Olympic synchronized swimmer
 Israel Joffe, United States government official at Federal Deposit Insurance Corporation, (FDIC)
 Jasper Joffe, British contemporary artist and novelist
 Joel Joffe, Lord Joffe, British life peer, former head of Oxfam, former lawyer to Nelson Mandela
 Josef Joffe, German and American journalist and international studies scholar
 Julia Ioffe, Russian-American journalist and blogger
 Manne Joffe, Swedish chess master
 Mark Joffe, Australian film director
 Mordecai Yoffe, East European rabbi and Judaism scholar
 Nadezhda Joffe, Soviet Trotskyist
 Rodney Joffe, internet entrepreneur and an internet data expert
 Roland Joffé, English-French film director
 Yudl Yoffe, Yiddish writer, translator and sculptor

See also 
 
 
 Jaffe family
 Jaffa (disambiguation)
 Jaffee
 Joffa (disambiguation)
 Yoffie

References 

Jewish surnames
Surnames
Surnames of Russian origin
Hebrew-language surnames
Yiddish-language surnames